"Si Alguna Vez" (English: If Sometime) is a song by Mexican singer-songwriter Thalía. The song served as the official theme for the telenovela Antes muerta que Lichita. It was released by Sony Music Latin on October 23, 2015.

Background and release
The song was released onto all digital platforms on October 23, 2015. The song marked Thalía's return to telenovelas after 16 years as the song was the official theme for Antes muerta que Lichita.

Reception
The song was well received by music critics, being nominated for Best Musical Theme at the 2016 TVyNovelas Awards and Premios Juventud. This was Thalía's first nomination for a TvyNovelas Awards since 2000.

Video
The song does not have an official music video, however Thalía released an audio video on her YouTube channel on October 27, 2015 and an official lyric video on November 8, 2015.

Accolades
The song was nominated for Best Theme Song at the TVyNovelas Awards and Premios Juventud.

References 

 

Thalía songs
2015 singles
Sony Music Latin singles
Spanish-language songs
2015 songs